Bruno Maximus (born 1970) is a Finnish art painter. His artistic style is "hypnorealism", or hypnotic dreamlike realism, deriving from surrealism. He has also lived and worked in Australia, Brazil, England and Hungary.

He has had numerous art exhibitions in Finland and has painted cover arts for Finnish music albums such as Kingston Wall's Tri-Logy and GAD's Apollo 3D.

External links
Bruno Maximus - Galleria Bronda
Paintings by Bruno Maximus

1970 births
Living people
Finnish male painters
20th-century Finnish painters
21st-century Finnish painters
21st-century male artists
20th-century Finnish male artists